Galamsey, derived from the phrase "gather them and sell", is local Ghanaian parlance that means illegal small-scale, gold mining in Ghana. Such workers are known as galamseyers or orpailleurs in neighboring Francophone nations. Galamseyers are people who perform illegal gold mining independent of mining companies, digging small working pits, tunnels, and sluices by hand. Galamsey is also referred to as Illegal Artisanal Small Scale mining (ASM).

Background
Generally, the galamseyers can dig only to a limited depth, far shallower and smaller than commercial mining companies. Under current Ghanaian law, it is illegal for galamseyers to dig on land granted to mining companies as concessions or licenses. Most galamseyers find gold in free metallic dust form or they process oxide or sulfide gold ore using liquid mercury.

The number of galamseyers in Ghana is unknown but believed to be from 20,000 to 50,000, including thousands from China. The Information Minister recently claimed there are now 200,000 people engaged in galamsey, and according to other sources, there are nearly 3 million who rely on it for their livelihoods. They mostly operate in the southern part of Ghana where there are substantial reserves of gold deposits, usually within the environs of the larger mining companies. As a group, they are economically disadvantaged. Galamsey settlements are usually poorer than neighboring agricultural villages. They have high rates of accidents and are exposed to mercury poisoning from their crude processing methods. Many women are among the workers, acting mostly as porters for the miners.

In some cases, galamseyers are the first to discover and work extensive gold deposits before mining companies find out and take over. Galamsey workings are an indicator of the presence of gold.

In the Francophone countries surrounding Ghana, similar local artisanal gold miners are called derailleurs.

Types of galamsey

Causes 
The major cause of galamsey is unemployment among the youth in Ghana. Young university graduates rarely find work, and when they do it hardly sustains them. The result is that these youth go the extra mile to earn a living for themselves and their family. Another factor is the lack of job security.

Dangers 
On 13 November 2009, a collapse occurred in an illegal, privately owned mine in Dompoase, in the Ashanti Region of Ghana. At least 18 workers were killed, including 13 women, who worked as porters for the miners. Officials described the disaster as the worst mine collapse in Ghanaian history  while the Appeatse Explosion is the worst mine related disaster in Ghanaian history.

Environmental impact 
Illegal mining damages the land and water supply. In March 2017, the Minister of Lands and Natural Resources, John Peter Amewu, gave the galamsey operators/illegal miners a three-week ultimatum to stop their activities or be prepared to face the law. The activities by galamseyers have depleted Ghana's forest cover and they have caused water pollution, due to the crude and unregulated nature of the mining process.

See also 
 Operation Vanguard, police response to illegal mining
 Crime in Ghana
Bunkering, oil theft and processing in Nigeria with similar legal and environmental issues

References

External links
 "Mining in Ghana – Golden future for the galamsey", World Business Council for Sustainable Development. Archived from the original.
 The Money Stone, a documentary film about the galamsey
 "Galamsey: Will Work for Gold" feature article from the Common Language Project

Further reading
 Galamsey – For a Fistful of Gold. Preuss, Johannes.

Crime in Ghana
Environmental issues in Ghana
Gold prospectors
Mining in Africa
Mining in Ghana
People in mining